Trysten Hill (born March 25, 1998) is an American football defensive tackle for the Cleveland Browns of the National Football League (NFL). He played college football at UCF.

Early years
Hill attended Suwannee High School in Live Oak, Florida, where he played as a defensive end. As a junior, he contributed to the team reaching the state semifinals and received All-area honors.

As a senior, he helped the team reach the FHSAA 5A regional finals and received Florida Class 5A All-State first-team honors. He was rated as a three-star recruit prospect, per ESPN.

College career
Hill originally committed to the Georgia Institute of Technology and then University of Virginia to play college football, before ultimately deciding to enroll at the University of Central Florida (UCF). As a true freshman, he started 13 games at defensive end, collecting 15 tackles (5 for loss), one sack, one quarterback hurry and one forced fumble.

As a sophomore, he started 13 games at defensive tackle, posting 20 tackles (4 for loss), 2 sacks and 5 quarterback hurries.

As a junior, it was reported that he fell out of favor with the coaching staff and only started one out of 12 games at defensive tackle. He registered 36 tackles, 3 sacks, 10.5 tackles for loss, while also having 2 carries for one rushing yard and one touchdown. He had 6 tackles, (3 for loss) and 2 sacks against the University of Memphis in the American Athletic Conference championship game. He was a part of a 25-game winning streak that ended against Louisiana State University in the 2019 Fiesta Bowl.

He finished his college career with 71 tackles and six sacks. After his junior season in 2018, he announced his intention to declare for the 2019 NFL Draft.

Professional career

Dallas Cowboys
Hill was selected by the Dallas Cowboys in the second round (58th overall) in the 2019 NFL Draft. He had an underwhelming season as a backup at the three-technique defensive tackle position. He registered 4 tackles and 3 quarterback pressures in 121 snaps. He was declared inactive in 9 games and appeared in just 3 contests after Week 7.

In 2020, he began the season as the starter at the three-technique defensive tackle position, after Gerald McCoy was lost for the season with a torn quadriceps injury. He generated controversy during the Week 3 game against the Seattle Seahawks due to a tackle on running back Chris Carson, during which Hill twisted Carson's knee after the play had ended, causing a sprain. Later in the same drive, Hill delivered a late, helmet-to-helmet hit on quarterback Russell Wilson, who was uninjured on the play. The league fined Hill $6,522 for each hit respectively, totaling $13,044. In Week 5 against the New York Giants, he tore his right ACL after pushing quarterback Daniel Jones and trying to hold him up to avoid a possible roughing the passer penalty. On October 19, he was placed on the injured reserve list. He started the first 5 games, while posting 14 tackles (one for loss) and 4 quarterback pressures.

On August 31, 2021, Hill was placed on the reserve/physically unable to perform list to start the season. He was activated on November 13. He was suspended one game after punching Raiders guard John Simpson in a postgame altercation after the Cowboys Week 12 loss to Las Vegas.

On November 1, 2022, Hill was waived by the Cowboys.

Arizona Cardinals 
Hill was claimed off waivers by the Arizona Cardinals on November 2, 2022. He was placed on injured reserve on December 28, 2022.

Cleveland Browns
On March 19, 2023, Hill signed with the Cleveland Browns.

References

External links

Arizona Cardinals bio
UCF Knights bio

1998 births
Living people
People from Madison County, Florida
Players of American football from Florida
American football defensive tackles
UCF Knights football players
Dallas Cowboys players
Arizona Cardinals players